Parapiptadenia is a genus of flowering plants in the family Fabaceae. It belongs to the mimosoid clade of the subfamily Caesalpinioideae.

Species
Species include:
 Parapiptadenia rigida (Benth.) Brenan

References

Mimosoids
Fabaceae genera